Alexander Alexandrovich Friedmann (also spelled Friedman or Fridman) (June 16 [O.S. 4], 1888 – September 16, 1925) was a Russian and Soviet physicist and mathematician. He is best known for his pioneering theory that the universe was expanding, governed by a set of equations he developed now known as the Friedmann equations.

Early life
Alexander Friedmann was born to the composer and ballet dancer Alexander Friedmann (who was a son of a baptized Jewish cantonist) and the pianist Ludmila Ignatievna Voyachek (who was a daughter of the Czech composer Hynek Vojáček). Friedmann was baptized into the Russian Orthodox Church as an infant, and lived much of his life in Saint Petersburg.

Friedmann obtained his degree from St. Petersburg State University in 1910, and became a lecturer at Saint Petersburg Mining Institute.

From his school days, Friedmann found a lifelong companion in Jacob Tamarkin, who was also a distinguished mathematician.

World War I
Friedmann fought in World War I on behalf of Imperial Russia, as an army aviator, an instructor, and eventually, under the revolutionary regime, as the head of an airplane factory.

Professorship
Friedmann in 1922 introduced the idea of an expanding universe that contained moving matter. Correspondence with Einstein suggests that Einstein was unwilling to accept the idea of an evolving Universe and worked instead to modify his equations to ensure a static eternal Universe as believed in Newton's time. Some years later, in 1926 Hubble published the redshift vs distance relationship, namely, all the galaxies in the neighborhood seemed to be receding at a rate proportional to their distance, formalizing an observation made earlier by Carl Wilhelm Wirtz. Unaware of Friedmann's work, in 1927 Belgian astronomer Georges Lemaître explained this by independently also describing an evolving Universe.

In June 1925 Friedmann was given the job of the director of the Main Geophysical Observatory in Leningrad.

Work
Friedmann's 1924 papers, including "" ("On the possibility of a world with constant negative curvature of space") published by the German physics journal Zeitschrift für Physik (Vol. 21, pp. 326–332), demonstrated that he had command of all three Friedmann models describing positive, zero and negative curvature respectively, a decade before Robertson and Walker published their analysis.

This dynamic cosmological model of general relativity would come to form the standard for both the Big Bang and Steady State theories. Friedmann's work supported both theories equally, so it was not until the detection of the cosmic microwave background radiation that the Steady State theory was abandoned in favor of the current favorite Big Bang paradigm.

The classic solution of the Einstein field equations that describes a homogeneous and isotropic universe was called the Friedmann–Lemaître–Robertson–Walker metric, or FLRW, after Friedmann, Georges Lemaître, Howard P. Robertson and Arthur Geoffrey Walker, who worked on the problem in the 1920s and 30s independently of Friedmann.

In addition to general relativity, Friedmann's interests included hydrodynamics and meteorology.

Physicists George Gamow, Vladimir Fock, and Lev Vasilievich Keller were among his students.

Personal life and death
In 1911, he married Ekaterina Dorofeeva, though he later divorced her. He married Natalia Malinina in 1923. They had a religious wedding ceremony, though both were far from religious.

Friedmann died on September 16, 1925, from misdiagnosed typhoid fever. He had allegedly contracted the bacteria on his way back from his honeymoon in Crimea when he ate an unwashed pear he bought from a railway station.

Legacy
The moon crater Fridman is named after him 

Alexander Friedmann International Seminar is a periodical scientific event. The objective of the meeting is to promote contact between scientists working in the field of Relativity, Gravitation and Cosmology, and related fields. The First Alexander Friedmann International Seminar on Gravitation and Cosmology devoted to the centenary of his birth took place in 1988.

During the 2022 COVID-19 protests in China, Tsinghua University students were seen displaying Friedmann's equation as if it were a protest slogan, which was understood as an evasion of censorship by punning multilingually on "free man" and referring to liberalization and opening via the expansion of the universe.

Selected publications
. English translation in:  The original Russian manuscript of this paper is preserved in the Ehrenfest archive, together with some letters and unpublished work.
. English translation in:

References

Bibliography

External links
 Alexander A Friedmann: The Man who Made the Universe Expand – Biography written by Eduard A. Tropp, Viktor Ya. Frenkel and Artur D. Chernin

How Do We Know the Age of the Universe – Mary Lynn Germadnik

1888 births
1925 deaths
Soviet mathematicians
20th-century Russian mathematicians
Russian relativity theorists
Soviet physicists
Scientists from Saint Petersburg
Pennsylvania State University faculty
Russian people of Jewish descent
Russian people of Czech descent
Lenin Prize winners